Scott Louis Shleifer (born 1977) is an American billionaire hedge fund manager, and the co-founder of Tiger Global Management's private equity investing business. As of September 2022, his net worth was estimated at US$3.5 billion.

Early life

Shleifer was born and raised in suburban Portland, Oregon. His father, Stuart Shleifer, ran Shleifer Furniture, the family business, until it closed. The company was founded in 1936 by Stuart Shleifer's father and grandfather, and the Shleifer Furniture building was originally the Chamberlin Hotel. The store closed in 2015, and was sold (along with a 15,000-square-foot warehouse) to Brad Malsin, head of Beam Development who plans to turn the 45,000-square-foot building back into a hotel. According to Scott, "My father sold couches for a living."

Shleifer graduated from Beaverton High School in 1995, and in 2021 donated $1.8 million to the school.

Shleifer earned a bachelor's degree from the University of Pennsylvania's Wharton School in 1999.

Career
After college, he worked as an analyst at Blackstone for three years. In 2003, Shleifer co-founded Tiger Global Management's private equity investing business. He moved Tiger Global into venture capital, especially in China, and expanded aggressively.

In 2019, he was included in Wharton magazine's "40 under 40" list, and said his no 1 role model is Julian Robertson. He is managing director and a partner at Tiger Global Management.

Personal life
Shleifer has been married to Elena since at least 2011, and they live in New York City. In February 2021, he purchased a 21,000-square-foot mansion in Palm Beach, Florida for $122.7 million. He reportedly only looked at the house for 15 minutes before deciding to buy it.

In January 2022, Scott and Elena Shleifer gave $18 million to the University of Pennsylvania.

References

1977 births
American billionaires
American hedge fund managers
University of Pennsylvania alumni
Businesspeople from Portland, Oregon
Living people